Different is the debut studio album by Belgian singer Kate Ryan. It was released in 2002 by EMI Records. The album was produced by AJ Duncan and Phil Wilde. It peaked at number eight in Belgium and was certified Gold.

Track listing
All songs produced by Phil Wilde and Andy Janssens a.k.a. AJ Duncan.

Original

Re-release

Singles

"Scream for More"
"UR (My Love)"
"Désenchantée"
"Mon Cœur Résiste Encore"
"Libertine"

Personnel

Kate Ryan – vocals, lyricist
Andy Janssens a.k.a. "AJ Duncan" – producer, lyricist
Phil Wilde – producer, lyricist
Shamrock - lyricist
Nina Babet - lyricist
Thierry Bidjeck - French translations ("Mon cœur résiste encore", "Nos Regards Qui M'Enflamment")
Marc Gilson - French translations ("Ne Baisse pas la Tête")
Mieke Aerts – backing vocals
Peter Bulkens – mixing
Lieve Gerrits – stylist
Patrick Hamilton – string arrangements
Philippe Mathys – photography
Eric Melaerts – guitar
Paul Van Der Jonckheyd – mastering

Charts

Weekly charts

Year-end charts

Certifications

References

2002 debut albums
Kate Ryan albums
EMI Records albums